Fersman Mineralogical Museum is one of the largest mineral museums of the world, located in Moscow, Russia. Its collections include more than 135,000 items. Among them natural crystals, geodes, druses and other kinds of mineral treasures. The museum was named after Alexander Fersman.

History

Early history
The museum was founded in 1716 in Saint Petersburg as a mineral cabinet of Kunstkamera. 

On 5 December 1747 a great fire destroyed virtually the whole collection. Only the most valuable items were saved, including the "Silver Horn". In 1836 the Kunstkamera was divided into 7 separate museums, including Mineralogical museum which was moved to the new building. In 1898 the museum was significantly expanded and renamed the Geological museum.

In Moscow
Museum was moved from Petersburg to Moscow in 1934 together with the Russian Academy of Sciences. Thirty railway carriages were required to move the museum's collection of more than 60,000 specimens.

Collections

All museum acquisitions since 1716 were divided at the beginning of 20th century by the academician Vladimir Vernadsky to 5 main collections:
 Systematic collection consists of more than 90000 items representing about 2400 mineral species (from 4000 species known in nature).
 Crystal collection includes more than 4800 crystals of minerals representing all crystal systems and most of space groups.
 Locality collections included more than 31000 specimens representing genetic features, mineral association and ore types.
 Pseudomorph collection includes about 2200 mineral specimens, representing different kinds pseudomorphs and also different features of mineral growing and transformations in various conditions.
 Gems and stone art collection includes among 8000 rough and faceted gemstones, items made of stones.

Directors

 1835–1845 Grigori Gelmersen
 1845–1857 Konstantin Grevingk
 1857–1866 Adolf Gebel
 1866–1873 Nikolai Koksharov
 1873–1900 Fyodor Shmidt
 1900–1906 Feodosy Chernyshov
 1906–1919 Vladimir Vernadsky
 1919–1945 Alexander Fersman
 1930–1945 Vladimir Kryzhanovsky (executive director)
 1945–1945 Vladimir Kryzhanovsky
 1947–1953 Dmitry S. Belyankin
 1953–1976 Georgi Barsanov
 1976–1980 Yuri Orlov
 1980–1982 Vladimir Sobolev
 1983–1995 Aleksandr Godovikov
 1995–2010 Margarita Novgorodova
2011–2015 Viktor Garanin
2016–present Pavel Plechov

References

External links

 Photo (1024x768)
  Fersman Mineralogical Museum home page
  Article in the GeoWikipedia

Mineralogy museums
Geology museums in Russia
Natural history museums in Russia
Museums in Moscow
1716 establishments in Russia